"Blue Zone" is a song recorded by Japanese singer Shizuka Kudo for her fourteenth studio album, Full of Love. It was released through Pony Canyon as the album's lead single on April 7, 1999. The song featured on TV commercials for Toyo tires. A song titled "I.n.g" was originally slated to be released in place of "Blue Zone". Since it does not appear on Full of Love, it is unclear whether the song was scrapped or if "I.n.g" was simply an alternate title. "Blue Zone" is the third and last in a trilogy of singles with "Blue" in the title: "Blue Zone" is preceded by "Blue Velvet" and "Blue Rose", respectively.

As well as being the last single released in Mini CD single format, "Blue Zone" was the last single Kudo released with Pony Canyon, until signing anew with the label in 2005 and releasing "Lotus (Umareshi Hana)".

Background
The song was written by Shizuka Kudo, under the pseudonym Aeri, and composed by Takashi Tsushimi. It is the first single with lyrics by Kudo since "Kama Sutra no Densetsu". The song is composed in the key of G major and Kudo's vocals span from A3 to B4. Lyrically, the song deals with the initiation of an inexperienced lover.

Cover version
Kumi Koda performed "Blue Zone" when auditioning for the second generation of Morning Musume., broadcast on the TX talent search show Asayan.

Chart performance
The single debuted at number 28 on the Oricon Singles Chart, selling 9,000 copies in its first week. It fell to number 45 the following week, with sales of 4,000 copies. "Blue Zone" charted in the top 100 for four weeks, selling a total of 20,000 copies.

Track listing

Charts

References

1999 songs
1999 singles
Songs with lyrics by Shizuka Kudo
Songs used as jingles
Shizuka Kudo songs
Pony Canyon singles